Clearlight or Clear Light may refer to:

Clear Light, a 1960s American psychedelic rock band
Clear Light (album), 1967 album by that band
Clearlight (French band), a 1970s progressive rock band
Clearlight (American band), a 2000s instrumental rock band
Ösel (yoga) or the Yoga of the Clear Light, a Tibetan meditation practice